Veronica regina-nivalis is a species of flowering plant in the figwort family known by the common name snowqueen, or snow queen. It is native to the Pacific coast of the United States from the Puget Sound to San Francisco Bay Area, where it grows in the forests of coastal and inland hills and mountains. It is a perennial herb growing up to about 15 centimeters tall. It has a rosette of basal leaves with hairy, lobed, heart-shaped or kidney-shaped blades borne on long petioles. The inflorescence is a small raceme of pale blue, lavender, or nearly white flowers each just under a centimeter long. The corollas are bell-shaped, the tube spreading into short lobes at the mouth, with two stamens tipped with large anthers.

Its common name alludes to the fact that it's one of the first wildflowers to bloom in late winter.

References

External links

Jepson Manual Treatment
Washington Burke Museum
Photo gallery

Plantaginaceae
Flora of California
Flora of Oregon
Flora of Washington (state)
Plants described in 1835
Flora without expected TNC conservation status